Binhai railway station, formerly Yujiapu railway station, is an underground railway station located in Binhai, Tianjin, People's Republic of China. It is the southern terminus of the Beijing–Tianjin intercity railway and serves the Yujiapu Financial District, an area with many new skyscrapers. It is considered one of the four main rail transportation hubs for Tianjin with Tianjin, Tianjin West and Binhai West railway station. It is to be served by the Tianjin Metro lines B1 and Z4.

History
The station's construction started on February 27, 2009, was completed on August 8, 2015 and it was opened to traffic on September 20, 2015.  The name of station was changed from Yujiapu to Binhai on January 5, 2019. Simultaneously, another station that was previously named Binhai had its name changed to Binhai West.

Gallery

Structure
The visible structure of the station is of a tear-drop shaped dome surrounded in parklands. Beneath the futuristic ground floor waiting hall's domed structure, the majority of the station is located in five underground levels. The first and second basement levels allows access to buses, taxis, public parking and ticket hall for the Tianjin Metro. The third basement level houses the Tianjin Metro B2 and B3 lines. The fourth basement level contains the platforms and access to the future Tianjin Metro Z1 line. The lowest Fifth Basement Level has three island platforms serving six tracks as the terminus of the Beijing–Tianjin intercity railway.

The ceiling, also the world's first single layer steel shell structure, looks like a delicate painting floating in the air. ETFE film was chosen for roofing and façade construction to improve structural integrity and save energy, with the roofing consisting of three-layered ETFE cushions.

Future 
Binhai railway station will be the northern terminus of the Tianjin–Weifang–Yantai high-speed railway, turning the current terminus station into a through station.

References

Railway stations in Tianjin
Skidmore, Owings & Merrill buildings
Railway stations in China opened in 2015